Sremska sausage (in Serbian "sremska kobasica") is a type of sausage from Serbia. It has its origin in the Serbian area of Srem. It contains a mixture of beef and pork meat spiced with paprika, black pepper, salt and "secret spices". It is slightly smoked and medium ground.

See also 

 Serbian cuisine
 List of sausages
 List of smoked foods

References 

Serbian cuisine
Serbian sausages
Smoked meat
Syrmia